The 2019 European Amateur Team Championship took place 9–13 July at Ljunghusen Golf Club in Höllviken, Sweden. It was the 36th men's golf European Amateur Team Championship.

Venue 

The hosting club was founded in 1932 and by 1965 it was the first golf club in Scandinavia to feature 27 holes, one of three clubs with links courses at the south west tip of Sweden, in Vellinge Municipality, Scania County. The championship was played at holes 1–18.

The championship course was set up with par 72.

Format 
Each team consisted of six players, playing two rounds of an opening stroke-play qualifying competition over two days, counting the five best scores each day for each team.

The eight best teams formed flight A, in knock-out match-play over the next three days. The teams were seeded based on their positions after the stroke play. The first placed team was drawn to play the quarter final against the eight placed team, the second against the seventh, the third against the sixth and the fourth against the fifth. Teams were allowed to use six players during the team matches, selecting four of them in the two morning foursome games and five players in to the afternoon single games. Teams knocked out after the quarter finals played one foursome game and four single games in each of their remaining matches. Games all square at the 18th hole were declared halved, if the team match was already decided.

The eight teams placed 9–16 in the qualification stroke-play formed flight B, to play similar knock-out play, with one foursome game and four single games in each match, to decide their final positions.

Teams 
16 nation teams contested the event. Each team consisted of six players. Belgium, Slovenia, and Wales had qualified for the championship by finishing first, second, and third in the 2018 Division 2. The other teams qualified by finishing top 13 in the 2018 championship.

Players in the leading teams

Other participating teams

Winners 
Leader of the opening 36-hole competition was team Ireland, with a 19-under-par score of 701, three strokes ahead of team England.

There was no official award for the lowest individual score, but individual leader was Euan Walker, Scotland, with a 12-under-par score of 132, two strokes ahead of nearest competitor.

Host nation Sweden won the gold medal, earning their third title and first since 1961, beating eleven-times-champion team England in the final 4–2.

Team Scotland earned the bronze on third place, after beating Denmark 4–3 in the bronze match.

Finland,  Czech Republic, and Slovenia placed 14th, 15th and 16th and was intended to be moved to Division 2 for 2020, to be replaced by Switzerland, Italy and Portugal, who finished first, second, and third respectively in the 2019 Division 2. The 2020 championship came to be reduced, due to the Covid-19 pandemic, with several teams not participating, why the qualification status was changed.

Results 
Qualification round

Team standings

* Note: In the event of a tie the order was determined by thebest total of the two non-counting scores of the two rounds.

Individual leaders

Note: There was no official award for the lowest individual score.

Flight A

Bracket

Final games

* Note: Game declared halved, since team match already decided.

Flight B

Bracket

Final standings

Sources:

See also 
 Eisenhower Trophy – biennial world amateur team golf championship for men organized by the International Golf Federation.
 European Ladies' Team Championship – European amateur team golf championship for women organised by the European Golf Association.

References

External links 
European Golf Association: Full results

European Amateur Team Championship
Golf tournaments in Sweden
European Amateur Team Championship
European Amateur Team Championship
European Amateur Team Championship